The 1934 LFF Lyga was the 13th season of the LFF Lyga football competition in Lithuania.  It was contested by 7 teams, and MSK Kaunas won the championship.

League standings

Playoff
MSK Kaunas 2-2 ; 5-1 LFLS Kaunas

References
RSSSF

LFF Lyga seasons
Lith
Lith
1